Iron Aces, known in Japan as , is a World War II flight simulation video game developed by Japanese studio Marionette and published by Xicat Interactive for the Dreamcast. It was released in Japan on June 29, 2000, in North America on February 6, 2001, and in Europe on June 29, 2001. A sequel to the game, Iron Aces 2: Birds of Prey, was released for the PlayStation 2 in 2002.

Gameplay
The game is set in a "semi-fictional World War 2", in which players battle for control of a series of fictional islands including Trincer and Valiant.

Reception
Iron Aces garnered mixed reviews from critics; it received a 69.48% from GameRankings. GameZone praised the variety of planes found in the game and the intense feel to the dogfights. IGN's Anthony Chau criticized the game's graphics, but noted that the game will suffice for flight simulator fans. GameSpot's Trevor Rivers noted that the game's inconsistency lowered the amount of fun to be had from the game, and gave it a mediocre overall review.

References

2000 video games
Dreamcast games
Dreamcast-only games
Kadokawa Dwango franchises
Multiplayer and single-player video games
Video games about World War II alternate histories
Video games developed in Japan
World War II flight simulation video games
Xicat Interactive games
GAE (company) games